Huazhou or Hua Prefecture was a zhou (prefecture) in imperial China seated in modern Hua County, Henan, China. It existed (intermittently) from 596 to 1374. Through history it was also known by other names, including Yan Prefecture (606–607), Dong Commandery (607–618) and Lingchang Commandery (742–758).

Counties
During the Song dynasty, Hua Prefecture administered the following counties:
Baima, roughly modern Hua County
Weicheng, also roughly modern Hua County
Zuocheng, Yanjin County

References

 
 
 

Prefectures of the Sui dynasty
Prefectures of the Tang dynasty
Jingxi North Circuit
Prefectures of Later Liang (Five Dynasties)
Prefectures of Later Tang
Prefectures of Later Jin (Five Dynasties)
Prefectures of Later Han (Five Dynasties)
Prefectures of Later Zhou
Prefectures of the Jin dynasty (1115–1234)
Prefectures of the Yuan dynasty
Prefectures of the Ming dynasty
Former prefectures in Henan